The 31st International Emmy Awards took place on November 24, 2003, at the Hilton Hotel in New York City, United States. The ceremony was hosted by Bob Costas.

Ceremony 
The nominees for the 31st International Emmy Awards were announced by International Academy of Television Arts and Sciences, on October 10, 2003, at a press conference at MIPCOM in Cannes. The United Kingdom led the list of nominees the 31st edition of the International Emmy Awards with 10 nominees, followed by Germany with 5 nominations. Japan pocketed two, the BBC was the broadcaster with the largest number of indicated programs, six in total.

The BBC was the big winner of the night taking home three awards, including the Children & Young People Award for Legend of the Lost Tribe. The project was a co-production between BBC Bristol and Comic Relief. The Kumars at No. 42 won the best popular arts award, while Arena: The Life and Times of Count Luchino Visconti took best arts programme.

The evening was highlighted by a program from Denmark being honored for the second year in a row in the Drama Series category -- Nikolaj og Julie from DR1. Additionally, programs from Germany were awarded in two categories. Colonia Media Filmproduktion GmbH's Mein Vater captured the TV Movies/Mini-Series category and Das Leben geht weiter took the Documentary category for Starcrest Media GmbH.

Channel 4's Without Prejudice won the popular arts category. The Channel 4 had already been handed the news coverage Emmy for The Fall of Saddam at a National Television Academy news and documentary ceremony in September.

Bob Costas and Sarah Jessica Parker were invited by the International Academy to present the 31st edition gala. Parker presented the International Emmy Founders Award to HBO, for its innovative programming, Greg Dyke - BBC director general - received the International Emmy Directorate Award,  for outstanding services to broadcasting.

Winners

References

External links 
 
 iEmmy nominees announced at Mipcom

International Emmy Awards ceremonies
2003 television awards
2003 in American television